Thomas Muster was the defending champion but chose to compete at Cincinnati in the same week, losing in the first round to Mark Woodforde.

Carlos Costa won the title by defeating Oliver Gross 6–1, 6–3 in the final.

Seeds

Draw

Finals

Top half

Bottom half

References

External links
 Official results archive (ATP)
 Official results archive (ITF)

San Marino CEPU Open
1994 ATP Tour